The Chilean Antarctic Territory or Chilean Antarctica (Spanish: Territorio Chileno Antártico, Antártica Chilena)  is the territory in Antarctica claimed by Chile. The Chilean Antarctic Territory ranges from 53° West to 90° West and from the South Pole to the 60° South parallel, partially overlapping the Argentine and British Antarctic claims. It is administered by the Cabo de Hornos municipality in the South American mainland.

The territory claimed by Chile covers the South Shetland Islands, Antarctic Peninsula, called "O'Higgins Land" ("Tierra de O'Higgins" in Spanish) in Chile, and adjacent islands, the Alexander Island, Charcot Island, and part of the Ellsworth Land, among others. It has an area of 1,250,257.6 km2. Its boundaries are defined by Decree 1747, issued on November 6, 1940, and published on June 21, 1955, the Ministry of Foreign Affairs established:

Within Chilean territorial organization Antártica is the name of the commune that administers the territory. The commune of Antártica is managed by the municipality of Cabo de Hornos with seat in Puerto Williams (thus being the only commune in Chile not to be administered by a municipality of its own) and belongs to Antártica Chilena Province, which is part of Magallanes y la Antártica Chilena Region. The commune of Antártica was created on July 11, 1961, and was dependent on the Magallanes Province until 1975, when the Antártica Chilena Province was created, making it dependent administratively on Puerto Williams, the province capital.

Chilean territorial claims on Antarctica are mainly based on historical, legal and geographical considerations. The exercise of Chilean sovereignty over the Chilean Antarctic Territory is put into effect in all aspects that are not limited by the signing of the Antarctic Treaty of 1959.
This treaty established that Antarctic activities are to be devoted exclusively to peaceful purposes of the signatories and acceding countries, thereby freezing territorial disputes and preventing the construction of new claims or the expansion of existing ones.

The Chilean Antarctic Territory corresponds geographically to areas UTC-4, UTC-5 and UTC-6 but it uses the Magallanes and Chilean Antarctica Time zone, summer time all the year (UTC-3).

Chile currently has 13 active Antarctic bases: 4 permanent, 5 seasonal and 4 shelters.

History

Chilean Antarctica in colonial times 

For many years, cartographers and European explorers speculated about the existence of the Terra Australis Incognita, a vast territory located in the south of the Strait of Magellan and Tierra del Fuego that reached the South Pole.

The Treaty of Tordesillas, signed on June 7, 1494, by Spain and Portugal (only) set their areas of global influence, west and east, respectively, according to a line running from pole to pole that was never demarcated (at 46° 37 'W in the Spanish classical interpretation, and further west, according to the Portuguese interpretation), so the Antarctic areas claimed by Chile today, still unknown at that time, fell within the area of Spanish influence. The treaty, backed by the papal bull Ea quae pro bono pacis in 1506, was not recognized by European non-Catholic states nor even by some Catholic ones, like France. For Britain, Netherlands, Russia and other countries, the Antarctic areas were considered res nullius, no man's land subject to the occupation of any nation.

In 1534, the Emperor Charles V divided in three governorates the South American territory:
 New Castile or Peru to Francisco Pizarro,
 New Toledo or Chile to Diego de Almagro and

In 1539, a new governorate was formed south of New León called Terra Australis to Pedro Sánchez de la Hoz. In 1554, the conqueror Pedro de Valdivia, who led the Governorate of Chile, talked to the Council of the Indies to give the rights of New León and the Terra Australis to Jeronimo de Alderete, who, after the death of Valdivia the following year, became governor of Chile and annexed the Chilean colonial territory.

There are numerous historical documents proving this, among which include a Royal Decree of 1554:

Later, in 1558, the Royal Decree of Brussels prompted the Chilean colonial government to take ownership in our name from the lands and provinces that fall in the demarcation of the Spanish crown in referring to the land across the Strait, because at that time it was thought that Tierra del Fuego was an integral part of the Terra Australis.

One of the most important works of Spanish literature, the epic poem La Araucana by Alonso de Ercilla (1569), is also considered by Chile as favorable to their argument, as shown in the seventh stanza of his Canto I:

In the fourth stanza of his Canto III:

There are also stories and maps, both Chilean and European, indicating the membership of the Terra Australis Antarctica as part of the Captaincy General of Chile.

The Spanish navigator Gabriel de Castilla sailed from Valparaiso in March 1603 in command of three ships in an expedition entrusted by his brother cousin viceroy of Peru, Luis de Velasco y Castilla, to repress the incursions of Dutch privateers in the Southern Seas, reaching 64 degrees south latitude. No documents confirming the reached latitude and sighted land have been found in the Spanish archives; however, the story of the Dutch sailor Laurenz Claesz (date unknown, but probably after 1607), documents the latitude and time. Claesz said:

Another Dutch document, published in Amsterdam in three languages in 1622, says that at 64°S there are "very high and mountainous, snow cover, like the country of Norway, all white, land It seemed to extend to the Solomon Islands."  This confirms a previous sighting of the lands would be the South Shetland Islands.

Other historians attribute the first sighting of Antarctic land to the Dutch marine Dirk Gerritsz, who would have found the islands now known as South Shetland. According to his account, his ship was diverted from course by a storm after transposing the Strait of Magellan, in the journey of a Dutch expedition to the East Indies in 1599. There are doubts about the veracity of Gerritsz.

At this time, there was already knowledge of the existence of a white continent in south of the Drake Passage, separated from the Tierra del Fuego. In 1772, the British James Cook circumnavigated waters of the Southern Ocean.

19th century 

After the independence of the colonies in the Americas, the new Spanish republics agreed among themselves to recognize the principle of uti possidetis-- that is, new states would have as limits those inherited from the Spanish colonies from which they originated. Therefore, the Republic of Chile consisted of all lands formerly belonging to the Captaincy General of Chile and then assumed that these titles included rights over portions of Antarctica.

In 1815, the Argentine-Irish Admiral William Brown launched a campaign to harass the Spanish fleet in the Pacific Ocean and, when passing Cape Horn, was brought down to the Antarctic sea beyond the parallel 65°S aboard the Argentine vessels Hércules and Trinidad. Brown's report indicated the presence of nearby ground, though he did not witness any portion of the continent and did not set foot on it.

On August 25, 1818, the Argentine government, then called the United Provinces of the Rio de la Plata, granted the first concessions for hunting earless seals and penguins for the Antarctic continent to Juan Pedro de Aguirre, who operated the ship Espíritu Santo based on Deception Island.

The ship Espíritu Santo was followed by the American brig Hercilia to Deception Island. The fact that these Argentine sealers were directed to the islands with fixed course is usually regarded as proof that it was previously known.

Between 1819 and 1821, the Russian ships Vostok and Mirny, under the command of the German Fabian Gottlieb von Bellingshausen at the service of Russia, explored Antarctic waters. In 1821, at 69°W 53'S, he sighted an island which he called Land of Alexander I, after the Russian Tsar.  Though he circumnavigated the continent twice, no member of either crew ever set foot on Antarctic land.

In 1819, the mariner William Smith rediscovered the South Shetland Islands, including King George Island; the American Nathaniel Palmer spotted the Antarctic Peninsula that same year.  Neither of them set foot on the actual continental land mass.

In 1821, the Connecticut seal hunter John Davis reported setting foot on a southern land that he believed was indeed a continent.

In 1823, the English James Weddell claimed to have discovered the sea that now bears his name, reaching up to 74°W 15'S and 34° 17'W.

On June 10, 1829, the Government of Buenos Aires issued a decree creating the Political-Military Command of the Malvinas Islands and adjacent to Cape Horn in the Atlantic Ocean, an act that is usually considered as Argentina including the Antarctic islands.

From those years, the hunting of baleen whales and South American sea lions began to increase in the zone.

In 1831, Chile's liberator Bernardo O'Higgins wrote to the Royal Navy, saying:

In 1843, a Chilean expedition founded the Fort Bulnes, taking possession of the Strait of Magellan, just days before British and French ships arrived for the same purpose.

In 1856, the treaty of friendship between Chile and Argentina that recognized boundaries was enacted uti possidetis juris, that is, those defined by the Spanish Empire until 1810.

The growth of the Chilean colony in Magallanes, and then in the city of Punta Arenas, allowed the founding of companies for hunting and exploitation of whales in Antarctic seas, which requested authorization from the government of Chile. In 1894, the power for the exploitation of marine resources in the south of the parallel 54°S was given to the Punta Arenas Municipality.

20th century 
In the early years of the 20th century, the interest of studying the Antarctic territories increased. Some of these expeditions asked permission from the government of Chile to be performed, among which one can highlight the Swedish teacher Otto Nordenskjöld in 1902 and the British teacher Robert F. Scott in 1900. Chile also gave mining permits, as conferred on December 31, 1902, Decree No. 3310 by Pedro Pablo Benavides to lease the Diego Ramírez Islands and San Ildefonso, may extend fishing south indefinitely on condition install a naval station in the islands.

On May 8, 1906, the Whaling Society of Magallanes was created with a base in Punta Arenas, which was authorized on December 1 to settle in the South Shetland Islands by Decree No. 1314 of the governor of Magallanes, which they did in Whalers Bay on Deception Island, there hoisted the Chilean flag and installing a coal deposit. That place was visited by Jean-Baptiste Charcot in December 1908 to replenish coal and continued to be inhabited in the summer season until 1914.

From 1906, they began to be promulgated several decrees, even from the National Congress of Chile, for mining permits in the Antarctic area. The Minister of Foreign Affairs of Chile mentioned on September 18, Chilean national day, of that year, the Chilean Antarctic rights in a memory and said that the delimitation of the territory would be subject to preliminary investigations. Argentina formally protested the June 10, 1907, for these actions in Chile and a negotiation process began for the mutual recognition of Antarctic territories. A limit was to be set to define two different areas, but this treaty was never signed.

On July 21, 1908, the United Kingdom officially announced its claim to sovereignty over all lands within the meridians 20° and 80° south of parallel 50°, in 1917 was moved to 58° south and in 1962, to the parallel 60° south.

In 1914, the British Ernest Shackleton began an expedition to cross the South Pole from the Weddell Sea to Ross Sea. With two ships, Endurance and Aurora, he went to Antarctica, but the weather worsened dramatically until an iceberg completely destroyed the first ship. Shackleton sailed to Argentine ports, the Falklands and South Georgia Islands without finding anyone who dared to be members of the expedition trapped in an Antarctic island. In Punta Arenas, however, he found the pilot Luis Pardo Villalón, who, aboard the Yelcho managed to rescue those shipwrecked on the Elephant Island. On September 4, 1916, they were received at the port of Punta Arenas as heroes. The Pilot Pardo feat, sailing with temperatures close to −30 °C (−22 °F) and a stormy sea of icebergs, made him win national and international recognition.

Sovereignty and Antarctic Treaty System 

On January 14, 1939, Norway declared its territorial claims on Antarctic territory between meridians 0° and 20° (Queen Maud Land), which alarmed the Chilean government, so the president Pedro Aguirre Cerda encouraged the definition of National Antarctic Territory and the September 7 of that year established by Decree No. 1541 a special commission to examine the country's interests in Antarctica.

The commission set the bounds according to the Theory of polar areas taking into account geographical, historical, legal and diplomatic precedents, which were formalized by Decree No. 1747, enacted on November 6, 1940, and published on June 21, 1955. As in Chile is considered their Antarctic rights arrived until the line Treaty of Tordesillas, the decree setting the limit of his claim in a meridian located further west (the 53° West), his claim to not include the South Orkney Islands in consideration of the rights of Argentina. Argentina formally protested by decree in a note November 12, 1940, rejecting its validity and expressing a potential claim to the same area. In turn, the United Kingdom objected to the February 25, 1941.

In the late 1940s, Argentina and Chile recognized each other "... that Chile and Argentina have unquestionable rights of sovereignty in the polar area called American Antarctica ("Antártida Americana" in Spanish)".

In January 1942, Argentina declared its Antarctic rights between the meridians 25° and 68° 24' W, that of Punta Dúngeness. On September 2, 1946, Decree No. 8944 set new boundaries for the Argentine Antarctic Sector between the meridians 25° and 74° west longitude. Finally, February 28, 1957, Decree Law No. 2129 established the definitive limits of their claim between the meridians 25° and 74° West and parallel 60° South latitude. This decree established a territory which is superimposed on part of the territory claimed by Chile.

Chile began to perform acts of sovereignty in the Antarctic continent with installation, Sovereignty Base current Arturo Prat in 1947. The following year, and as a way of settling the Chilean claims, the President Gabriel Gonzalez Videla opened the Base General Bernardo O'Higgins Riquelme, the first official visit of Head of state to Antarctica.

On 4 March 1948, Chile and Argentina signed an agreement on mutual protection and legal defense of its Antarctic territorial rights, recognizing each other:

In 1953, the representative of India in United Nations presented a project for the internationalization of Antarctica, movement which adhered several countries without a history of acts of sovereignty over the Antarctic territory. That if they had started efforts to avoid internationalization, and Chilean ambassador in New Delhi, Miguel Serrano, persuaded the Prime Minister Jawaharlal Nehru down the proposal.

On May 4, 1955, the United Kingdom filed two lawsuits against Argentina and Chile, respectively, before the International Court of Justice for it to declare the invalidity of claims of sovereignty of the two countries on Antarctic and sub-Antarctic areas. On July 15, 1955, the Chilean government rejected the jurisdiction of the Court in that case and on August 1 so did the Argentine government, so the 16 March 1956 claims were filed.

Law No. 11486 of June 17, 1955 added the Chilean Antarctic Territory to the Province of Magallanes, which became on July 12, 1974, the XII Region of Magallanes and Chilean Antarctica.

In 1958, the president of the US Dwight Eisenhower invited Chile to the Conference by the International Geophysical Year to resolve the issue Antarctic. On 1 December 1959, Chile signed the Antarctic Treaty, which stated that:
 Antarctica is World Heritage Site.
 Gives the Antarctic territory for peaceful purposes, prevented the military installation or navy.
 The signatory countries of the treaty with right establish base scientific purposes (marine biology, Seismology, volcanology, etc.).
 Freeze all the territorial claims, ensuring each signatory nation to a status quo for the duration of the treaty.
 In this territory for peaceful purposes can not be made nuclear tests, or war, nor leave toxic waste.

In July 2003, Chile and Argentina began installing a common shelter called  Abrazo de Maipú, halfway between O'Higgins bases, Chile, and Esperanza, Argentina.

Geography and climate 

The Chilean Antarctic Territory covers an area of 1,250,257.6 km2, equivalent to more than 60% of total Chilean surface, which is covered in its entirety, except for small coastal areas, with a thick layer of ice and snow, which can exceed 1200 meters deep in some areas of the interior of the continent.

The Chilean claim is mainly constituted by a sector of the Lesser Antarctica or West Antarctica, which includes the Antarctic Peninsula, known in Chile as Land of O'Higgins, it is crossed longitudinally by the mountains of the Antartandes. This mountain range is the continuation of the Andes. The Antartandes in turn, clearly differentiate three geographic areas in the Land of O'Higgins: the western slope, the central plateau and the eastern slope.

Antartandes reach the 3239 meters of altitude in the Mount Hope.

Within the land claimed by Chile, in southwest of the territory are the highest summits of the Antarctic continent, including the point of highest elevation, which are part of the Sentinel Range:
 Vinson Massif of 4897 m
 Mount Tyree of 4852 m
 Mount Shinn of 4800 m

The claimed territory has a subglacial lake, the Lake CECs, which was discovered in January 2014 by scientists of Centro de Estudios Científicos headquartered in Valdivia, Chile, and was validated in May 2015 with the publication in the journal Geophysical Research Letters, which is a specialist in the topic. The lake has an estimated 18 km2 area, is 2.6 km deep under the ice, is located in a buffer zone of three major glaciers so it is in a low-disturbance, and its ice motion is almost nonexistent. There is a hypothesis that it could have life, this would have developed in conditions of extreme isolation and the lake is encapsulated.

Precipitation in the territory is relatively rare and decreases towards the South Pole, creating polar desert conditions.

Coastal areas more to the North, as the north of Antarctic Peninsula and the South Shetland Islands, have a subpolar climate or tundra, that is, the temperature average of the warmest month exceeds 0 °C (32 °F), some lands are permafrost. The rest of the territory is under the regime of Polar climate.

Population 
The Antártica Commune has a population of 150 inhabitants on the Chilean bases, according to the census conducted nationwide in 2012, corresponding to 54 civilians and 96 military. These people are mostly members of the Chilean Air Force and their families, who live mostly in Villa Las Estrellas. This town, located next to the Base Presidente Eduardo Frei Montalva, on King George Island, was opened on April 9, 1984, and has an airport, a bank, a school and child care, a hospital, a supermarket, mobile telephony and television.

In 1984 the first Antarctic Chilean, Juan Pablo Camacho Martino, was born in Villa Las Estrellas. So far, a total of three people have been born in the Chilean Bases. At present, the development of tourism has increased explosively through airplanes and cruise ships that depart from Punta Arenas or Ushuaia, Most of the flights that arrive to King George Island are handled by Dap Group.

Bases, stations, shelters and settlements 

Due to the geographical characteristics of the Antarctic Peninsula, it has the best conditions for the development of human life. 

There are four Chilean permanent bases operating through the year, while there are five that remain open only during the summer  (December – March) (Seasonal) with four shelters.

The largest population center is located in King George Island and is formed by the Base Presidente Eduardo Frei Montalva (1980), which has an airstrip, the Meteorological Center President Frei (1969) and the Villa Las Estrellas. Belonging to Chile, this enclave is the nucleus of more important logistical support to the remaining countries with scientific bases on King George Island.

The Chilean Antarctic Institute (INACH) under the Ministry of Foreign Affairs, opened on the same island Base Professor Julio Escudero, chief scientific center of Chile in Antarctica.

The Chilean Navy also assists in the Mendel Polar Station belonging to Czech Republic from the January 14, 1995.
The maximum is four Chilean researchers to carry out scientific work at the base. To realize this possibility, Chilean researchers must submit a letter from a leading Czech researcher, who collaborate in its proposal
List of Chilean Antarctic Bases:

(P): Permanent; Are open all the year.
(S): Seasonal; Are open in the Austral Summer.
The largest population center is located on King George Island and consists of Frei Montalva Station, which has an airport (Teniente Rodolfo Marsh Martin Aerodrome, ICAO Code SCRM ), and which is connected to the communal capital, the village of Villa Las Estrellas, which has a town hall, hotel, day-care center, school, scientific equipment, hospital, post office and bank. This enclave is a center of logistical support for the other eight countries with scientific bases on King George Island.

Nearby Professor Julio Escudero Base, controlled by the Chilean Antarctic Institute (INACH), under the Ministry of Foreign Relations, is the main Chilean scientific facility in Antarctica.

Captain Arturo Prat Base is a Chilean Antarctic research base located on Greenwich Island. Opened February 6, 1947, it is the oldest Chilean Antarctic base. Until March 1, 2006, it was a base of the Chilean Navy, on which date it was handed over to the regional government of Magallanes y la Antártica Chilena Region. Until February, 2004, it had been a permanent base. Afterwards, it had served as a summer base of ionospheric and meteorological research. The base reopened in March 2008 for permanent occupancy.

The only permanent Chilean base on the Antarctic mainland (Antarctic Peninsula), Base General Bernardo O'Higgins Riquelme, has been in operation since February 18, 1948. It is located on Puerto Covadonga and it is the official communal capital.

Seasonal bases

 Estación Polar Científica Conjunta "Glaciar Unión" ; (Scientific Polar Station Joint "Union Glacier" in English ) Teniente Arturo Parodi Alister Base and Antonio Huneeus Antarctic Bases moved to the new location, it is ubicated in the Ellsworth Mountains, Union Glacier. The company Antarctic Logistics & Expeditions LLC is operating the airport on the Union Glacier since 2008.
 Dr. Guillermo Mann Base ; summer base of the Chilean Antarctic Institute (INACH), under the Ministry of Foreign Relations, on Livingston Island. Weather and ecological research station. Archaeological research site about former sealers. Another former Chilean refuge also called "Dr. Guillermo Mann" (or Spring-INACH), located in P. Spring (Pen. Palmer), is in ruins.
 Luis Risopatrón Base (formerly "Copper Mine Naval Refuge") ; summer station of the Chilean Navy at Robert Island. Geodetic, geophysical and biological research station.
 Julio Ripamondi Base ; little summer station of the Chilean Antarctic Institute (INACH), located on Ardley Island, next to Frei Montalva Station and Professor Julio Escudero Base (nearby located in the King George Island). The Ripamondi Base conducts research on geodesy and cartography (since 1997), terrestrial biology (since 1988) and studies of penguins (since 1988). The base is located near a large colony of gentoo penguins.
 González Videla Antarctic Base ; station of the Chilean Air Force on the Antarctic mainland's Waterboat Point in Paradise Bay. It is now an "inactive" base, it started to be repaired since 2003, with fuel and supplies in storage in the buildings for emergency use, or in case the base was to be reactivated in the future. Occasional summer visits are made by Chilean scientists and tourists. The base was recently used (2011) in researches of the Chilean Antarctic Institute (INACH)
 Yelcho Base  (ex Sub Base Yelcho) is located in the south bay of Doumer Island, Palmer archipelago, was reopened in March 2015.
 Collins Base  is located in the Fildes Peninsula, King George Island. It has a capacity of two persons in summer, it is used for scientific research and is administrated by the INACH.

Gallery

Notes 

 It corresponds to 62.28% of the national territory total, if the Chilean Antarctic Territory is included.

See also 

  Territorio Chileno Antártico
 Antarctic Treaty System
 List of Antarctic territorial claims
 Antártica Chilena Province
 Antártica (Commune)
 Magallanes and Antártica Chilena Region
 Argentine Antarctica
 Australian Antarctic Territory
 Ross Dependency
 Marie Byrd Land
 British Antarctic Territory
 Tierra del Fuego Province, Chile
 Tierra del Fuego Province, Argentina
 Beagle Channel Arbitration
 Falkland Islands
 Villa Las Estrellas
 Peter I Island
 Queen Maud Land

References

External links

  Gobierno Regional Magallanes y Antártica Chilena Official website
  Gobernación Provincia de Antártica Chilena Official website
  Chilean Antarctic Institute Official website
   Chilean Sea Document
  Municipality of Cape Horn

 
Territorial claims in Antarctica
Magallanes Region
States and territories established in 1940
1940 establishments in Antarctica